Tommy Lee Jones (born September 15, 1946) is an American actor and film director. Known for his gruff and authoritative film roles, he has received various accolades including an Academy Award, a Golden Globe Award, a Primetime Emmy Award and two Screen Actors Guild Awards. 

He won the Academy Award for Best Supporting Actor for his performance as U.S. Marshal Samuel Gerard in the thriller film The Fugitive (1993). His other Oscar-nominated roles were as businessman Clay Shaw in JFK (1991), Hank Deerfield in In the Valley of Elah (2007), and Congressman Thaddeus Stevens in Lincoln (2012). He gained prominence for his role as Agent K in the Men in Black franchise. Other notable roles were in Coal Miner's Daughter (1980), Natural Born Killers (1994), The Client (1994), Batman Forever (1995), Double Jeopardy (1999), No Country for Old Men (2007), The Company Men (2010), Captain America: The First Avenger (2011), Jason Bourne (2016), and Ad Astra (2019). 

Jones won the Primetime Emmy Award for Outstanding Lead Actor in a Limited Series or Movie for his role as executed murderer Gary Gilmore in The Executioner's Song (1983). He was further nominated for playing Texas Ranger Woodrow F. Call in the television miniseries Lonesome Dove (1989). He portrayed Howard Hughes in the CBS film The Amazing Howard Hughes (1977). He directed and starred in the western TNT movie The Good Old Boys (1995). He directed, starred in and executive produced the HBO film The Sunset Limited (2011).

Early life

Jones was born on September 15, 1946, in San Saba, Texas. His mother, Lucille Marie Jones (1928–2013), was a police officer, school teacher, and beauty shop owner, and his Welsh father, Clyde C. Jones (1926–1986), was a cowboy and oil field worker. The two were married and divorced twice. He has said that he is of part Cherokee descent. He was raised in Midland, Texas, and attended the then-named Robert E. Lee High School.

Jones soon moved to Dallas and graduated from the St. Mark's School of Texas in 1965, which he attended on scholarship.

College
He attended Harvard College on need-based aid; his roommate was future Vice President Al Gore. As an upperclassman, he lived in Dunster House with roommates Gore and Bob Somerby, who later became editor of the media criticism site The Daily Howler. Jones graduated cum laude with a Bachelor of Arts degree in English in 1969; his senior thesis was on "the mechanics of Catholicism" in the works of Flannery O'Connor. At Harvard, he was a pupil of dramatist Robert Chapman.

College football

Jones played guard at Harvard from 1965 to 1968. He was a member of Harvard's undefeated 1968 football team. He was named as a first-team All-Ivy League selection, and played in the 1968 Game. The game featured a memorable and last-minute Harvard 16-point comeback to tie Yale. He recounted his memory of "the most famous football game in Ivy League history" in the documentary Harvard Beats Yale 29–29.

Career

Early acting and film (1960s–1980)

Jones moved to New York to become an actor, making his Broadway debut in 1969's A Patriot for Me in a number of supporting roles. In 1970, he landed his first film role, coincidentally playing a Harvard student in Love Story (Erich Segal, the author of Love Story, said that he based the lead character of Oliver on aspects of two undergraduate roommates he knew while on a sabbatical at Harvard, Jones and Al Gore).

In early 1971, he returned to Broadway in Abe Burrows' Four on a Garden where he shared the stage with Carol Channing and Sid Caesar. Between 1971 and 1975 he portrayed Dr. Mark Toland on the ABC soap opera One Life to Live. He returned to the stage for a short-lived 1974 production of Ulysses in Nighttown, an adaptation of one episode from James Joyce's novel Ulysses, playing Stephen Dedalus opposite Zero Mostel's Leopold Bloom and directed by Burgess Meredith. It was followed by the acclaimed TV movie The Amazing Howard Hughes, where he played the lead role.

In films, he played a hunted escaped convict  in Jackson County Jail (1976); a Vietnam veteran in Rolling Thunder (1977); an automobile mogul, co-starring with Laurence Olivier, in the Harold Robbins drama The Betsy; and a police detective opposite Faye Dunaway in the 1978 thriller Eyes of Laura Mars.

In 1980, Jones earned his first Golden Globe nomination for his portrayal of country singer Loretta Lynn's husband, Doolittle "Mooney" Lynn, in Coal Miner's Daughter. In 1981, he played a drifter opposite Sally Field in Back Roads, a comedy that received middling reviews.

Increased exposure (1983–2004)
In 1983, he received an Emmy for Best Actor for his performance as murderer Gary Gilmore in a TV adaptation of Norman Mailer's The Executioner's Song. The same year, he starred in a pirate adventure, Nate and Hayes, playing pirate captain Bully Hayes.

In 1989, he earned another Emmy nomination for his portrayal of Texas Ranger Woodrow F. Call in the acclaimed television mini-series Lonesome Dove, based on the best-seller by Larry McMurtry.

In the 1990s, Jones was featured in blockbuster films such as JFK co-starring Kevin Costner (which earned him an Oscar nomination), The Fugitive co-starring Harrison Ford, Batman Forever co-starring Val Kilmer, Volcano co-starring Anne Heche, and Men in Black with Will Smith. His performance as Deputy U.S. Marshal Samuel Gerard in The Fugitive received broad acclaim and an Academy Award for Best Supporting Actor and a sequel. When he accepted his Oscar, his head was shaved for his role in the film Cobb, which he made light of in his speech: "The only thing a man can say at a time like this is 'I am not really bald'. Actually I'm lucky to be working".

Among his other well-known performances during the 1990s were those of a terrorist who hijacks a U.S. Navy battleship in Under Siege, the role of "Reverend" Roy Foltrigg in The Client, a maximum-security prison warden who's in way over his head in Natural Born Killers and a parole officer in Double Jeopardy.

Jones co-starred with director Clint Eastwood as astronauts in the 2000 film Space Cowboys, in which both played retired pilots and friends/rivals leading a space rescue mission together.  In 2002, he and Will Smith co-starred in the Men in Black sequel, Men in Black II.

Later years (2005–present)

In 2005, the first theatrical feature film Jones directed, The Three Burials of Melquiades Estrada, was presented at the 2005 Cannes Film Festival. Jones's character speaks both English and Spanish in the film. His performance won him the Best Actor Award at Cannes. His first film as a director had been The Good Old Boys in 1995, a made-for-television movie.

Two strong performances in 2007 marked a resurgence in Jones's career, one as a beleaguered father investigating the disappearance of his soldier son in In the Valley of Elah, the other as a Texas sheriff hunting an assassin in the Oscar-winning No Country for Old Men. For the former, he was nominated for an Academy Award.

Jones has been a spokesman for Japanese brewing company Suntory since 2006. He can be seen in various Japanese TV commercials of Suntory's Coffee brand Boss as a character called "Alien Jones," an extraterrestrial who takes the form of a human being to check on the world of humans. Many of these commercials can be seen on YouTube. In 2011, Jones appeared in public service announcements on Japanese television, joining a number of other popular figures who sang two sentimental songs in remembrance of those lost in the 2011 Tōhoku earthquake and tsunami.

In 2010, Jones appeared alongside Ben Affleck in the recession drama The Company Men. The film premiered at the Sundance Film Festival, where early reviews praised Jones's performance as "pitch-perfect." Jones had a role in the Marvel Studios film, Captain America: The First Avenger. He also directed, produced and co-starred with Samuel L. Jackson in an adaptation of The Sunset Limited.

In 2012, there was another turning point in Jones's career, starting with playing Agent K again in Men in Black 3, portraying Arnold Soames in the romantic dramedy Hope Springs, and co-starring as Thaddeus Stevens in Steven Spielberg's Lincoln. Jones's performance in Lincoln received wide critical acclaim, and he was nominated for an Oscar for the fourth time, for Best Supporting Actor.

Personal life
Jones was married to Kate Lardner, the niece of screenwriter and journalist Ring Lardner Jr., from 1971 to 1978. He has two children from his second marriage to Kimberlea Cloughley, the daughter of Phil Hardberger, former mayor of San Antonio. On March 19, 2001, he married his third wife, Dawn Laurel.

Jones resides in Terrell Hills, Texas, a city just outside of downtown San Antonio, and speaks Spanish. He owns a  cattle ranch in San Saba County, Texas, and a ranch near Van Horn, Texas, which served as the set for his film The Three Burials of Melquiades Estrada. He owned an equestrian estate in Wellington, Florida, until he sold it in 2019. Jones is a polo player, and he has a house in a polo country club in Buenos Aires, Argentina. He is a supporter of the Polo Training Foundation. He is an avid San Antonio Spurs fan; he is often seen courtside at Spurs games. At the 2000 Democratic National Convention, he gave the nominating speech for his former college roommate, Al Gore, as the Democratic Party's nominee for President of the United States.

Filmography

Awards and honors

See also

Notable alumni of St. Mark's School of Texas

References

Further reading
 Grunert, Andrea, "Les bons et les méchants selon Tommy Lee Jones", in: Francis Bordat et Serge Chauvin (eds.) Les bons et les méchants Université Paris X, 2005, p. 339–352,

External links

 
 
 
 
 
 
 Harvard Football bio

1946 births
20th-century American male actors
21st-century American male actors
American people of Welsh descent
Male actors from Texas
American male film actors
American football offensive linemen
American polo players
American male stage actors
American male soap opera actors
American male television actors
Best Supporting Actor Academy Award winners
Best Supporting Actor Golden Globe (film) winners
Cannes Film Festival Award for Best Actor winners
Harvard Crimson football players
Living people
Outstanding Performance by a Lead Actor in a Miniseries or Movie Primetime Emmy Award winners
Outstanding Performance by a Cast in a Motion Picture Screen Actors Guild Award winners
People from Midland, Texas
Male actors from San Antonio
People from San Saba, Texas
Robert E. Lee High School (Midland, Texas) alumni
St. Mark's School (Texas) alumni
Male Western (genre) film actors
Film directors from Texas
Outstanding Performance by a Male Actor in a Supporting Role Screen Actors Guild Award winners
People from Wellington, Florida
Film producers from Texas
American male screenwriters
Texas Democrats
People from Bexar County, Texas
American people who self-identify as being of Native American descent
Screenwriters from Texas